Dehr may refer to:
 Dehu Road railway station, station code DEHR, a railway station of Pune Suburban Railway in India.
 Deus Ex: Human Revolution, a video game
 Public Power Corporation, ticker symbol DEHr, in Greece.

See also
 Dare (disambiguation)
 Deir (disambiguation)
 Der (disambiguation)
 Dere (disambiguation)
 Dher